Omobranchus banditus, the bandit blenny, is a species of combtooth blenny found in the western Indian Ocean.  This species can reach a length of  SL.

References

banditus
Taxa named by J. L. B. Smith
Fish described in 1959